Hilarów may refer to the following places:
Hilarów, Łódź Voivodeship (central Poland)
Hilarów, Sochaczew County in Masovian Voivodeship (east-central Poland)
Hilarów, Sokołów County in Masovian Voivodeship (east-central Poland)
Hilarów, Greater Poland Voivodeship (west-central Poland)